Philatelic expertisation is the process whereby an authority is asked to give an opinion whether a philatelic item is genuine and whether it has been repaired or altered in any way.

Forging and faking, regumming and reperforating of stamps is common in the philatelic marketplace, and increasingly buyers demand an expert certificate before buying a valuable item. Some items are so often faked or altered that they may be almost unsaleable without a certificate.

The process of expertisation 
Experts may be individuals or committees but they will all follow a similar process to determine whether an item is genuine. The opinions of experts differ and have evolved over time. Conflicting expert opinions, such as on colour shade or whether a stamp has been reperforated, can have a huge effect on a stamp's value.

Stamps
Experts will attempt to determine whether a questioned stamp is a genuine example of a particular stamp issue; that is, whether it was printed at the same time from the same plate or stone as that stamp issue.  Among the factors they may consider are: 

Is the stamp's design identical to those of genuine ones?  Forged stamps almost invariably differ to a greater or lesser degree from genuine ones.
Is the size of the stamp correct?
Was the stamp printed using the same printing method, e.g., lithography, engraving, etc.?
Is the paper identical to the paper used for genuine stamps? Is the thickness, color, and type of paper (laid or wove) correct?
Does the stamp contain the correct watermark as do genuine ones?
Are the perforations correct, e.g., is the spacing of the perforations correct; are they of the same size, type, and shape as those on the genuine stamp?
Is the color of the stamp correct?  Is it printed with the right inks?  Some inks may react to ultraviolet light, for example.
Does the stamp have the correct tagging?
Does the stamp have the correct gum?
Even if the stamp was printed from the original plates or stone, is it a reprint made later, either officially or unofficially?  There may be subtle differences in color, paper or design.

Experts also will ask whether the stamp been altered in any fashion:
Has the color of the stamp been changed?  This sometimes can be done chemically.
Have perforations been added or removed to make it appear imperforate or coil?
Has the design been changed in any fashion?  Sometimes, the denomination on a common stamp from a series has been changed to a rare denomination.
Has an overprint been added or removed?
Has a cancellation been added or removed?  If the stamp is cancelled, is the cancellation genuine and of the proper period for the stamp?
Has a grill been pressed out? Used grills of the US 1869 Pictorial Issue can be pressed out to appear to be 1875 re-issues.
Have other changes been made?  The common 4 annas bicolor stamp of India has been altered by cutting out the image of Queen Victoria and remounting it upside down, or by chemically erasing the image and reprinting it upside down, to make the stamp appear to be the rare invert.

Experts will also attempt to determine whether genuine stamps have been repaired or cleaned:

Has a tear been mended?
Has a missing piece been restored?
Has a thin spot or hole in the paper been repaired?
Has the stamp been cleaned?
Has the stamp been regummed?
Have short or missing perforations been repaired?
Has a crease been repaired?

Covers
Among the factors experts may consider for a cover are:

 The cover itself:
 Are there any repairs to the cover
 Sealed tears
 Stains removed by bleaching
 Cutting down one side of the envelope to remove a torn edge where the envelope was opened
 Erased pencil marks written by earlier stamp collectors
 Is the cover faked:
 Is the paper from the time period when the cover went through the mail?
 The stamps on the cover:
 Are the stamps genuine or forged?
 Are the stamps correctly used?  For example, using a stamp years after it is no longer valid for postage
 Have the stamps been repaired (cleaned, bleached, reperforated)?
 Have the stamps been removed from the cover and reglued to it? Usually done to identify rare varieties of the stamps
 Have stamps been removed from the cover?
 Have stamps been added to the cover which were not present when the cover passed through the mail?  For example, adding a rarely used stamp to an existing cover to make an ordinary cover extremely valuable
 Have the stamps been removed and replaced with different stamps?  For example, removing a stamp in excellent condition and replacing it with one having damage to the back, giving that the damaged backside of the stamp will not be visible.
 The postal markings on the cover
 Are the postal markings genuine?
 Are the postal markings appropriate from the time period used?
 Have extra faked postal markings been added to the cover to make it more valuable?
 Is the ink genuine and from the time period used?

The tools of expertisation 
Experts will often maintain their own library of fakes and forgeries, and they also have access to the records of past genuine items that they have seen. They will usually have a large library of philatelic literature to refer to.

Scientific equipment is essential, including:
Binocular and comparison microscopes
Paper micrometers
Ultraviolet and infrared energy sources
Photometric colour determination equipment
X-ray fluorescence and spectro-photometry equipment.

Common sense and above all, experience, are also vital.

Expert certificates and marks

Once an item has been examined, the expert(s) will issue a certificate giving their findings which will include identification, genuineness or otherwise and comments about any alterations or unusual features. The certificate will normally feature a photograph of the item and be signed. It may also be embossed or have other security features. In the past it was common for experts to sign or add their mark to the back of stamps, however, this is nowadays uncommon as it is by some regarded as an undesired alteration. In Germany (BPP) it is still common practise to sign many items, but generally not the most valuable.

There have been instances where expert certificates have themselves been faked  and in the "Blüm Case", a forger produced false expertizing marks that were applied to German colony stamps and others.

Finding experts 
In the United States, the Philatelic Foundation, American Philatelic Society and numerous specialized stamp collecting organizations have committees who will perform expertisation for a fee. In Great Britain The Royal Philatelic Society London has a renowned expert committee which is also the oldest in the world, and of equal fame is the BPA expert committee. German experts usually belong to the Bund Philatelistischer Prüfer (BPP). Specialized in their countries issues are e.g. the expert committees of NVPH (Netherlands), COMEX (Spain), Isphila (Turkey). - In addition, the International Association of Philatelic Experts (AIEP) is a worldwide organisation for independent stamp experts.

The results of expertisation may be challenged, and in some cases further research has shown the genuineness of an item considered a forgery, or vice versa.

See also 

 Expertisation
 Philatelic fakes and forgeries

References

External links
Aspects of Philatelic Expertising - Part I by Simon Dunkerley
Filatelia.fi list of philatelic experts (Includes more than 1700 experts, past and present, with their marks.)

Philatelic fakes and forgeries